HMS Loyalty was a turbine-powered  of the Royal Navy, formerly HMS Rattler . She served during the Second World War. Commissioned in 1943, Loyalty saw action off the coast of Normandy during the Allied assault there in 1944. While performing duties off the coast, the ship was torpedoed by a German submarine and sank.

Design and description
The ships' complement consisted of 85 officers and ratings.

The ships had two Parsons geared steam turbines, each driving one shaft, using steam provided by two Admiralty three-drum boilers.

The Algerine class was armed with a QF  Mk V anti-aircraft gun and four twin-gun mounts for Oerlikon 20 mm cannon. The latter guns were in short supply when the first ships were being completed and they often got a proportion of single mounts. By 1944, single-barrel Bofors 40 mm mounts began replacing the twin 20 mm mounts on a one for one basis. All of the ships were fitted for four throwers and two rails for depth charges.

Service
Rattler was laid down on 14 April 1941 at Harland and Wolff, Belfast, launched on 9 December 1942 and commissioned on 22 April 1943. She was adopted by the community of Ripley, North Yorkshire after a Warship Week national savings campaign in March 1942.

After commissioning she was assigned to the 18th Minesweeping Flotilla, joining them in June 1943, when she was renamed Loyalty. She and the other ships of the flotilla carried out sweeping operations in Lyme Bay and the English Channel. She and other ships of the flotilla were transferred to Harwich in August to sweep areas of the North Sea, but was soon transferred to the 9th Flotilla, at Dover. On 25 August Loyalty was part of Operation Starkey, an attempt to attract German aircraft to unusual minesweeping operations near the French coast. They returned to Dover, but were mistakenly fired on by British shore batteries, causing further damage. Loyalty did not return to minesweeping duties until October.

In November Loyalty transferred to Scapa Flow to join the 15th Minesweeping Flotilla with the Home Fleet. She transferred again in December to the Orkney and Shetland Command, operating out of Seidisfjord on anti-submarine patrols and local convoy escort duties. She remained here until being nominated to return to the UK in March 1944 and in April underwent a refit at Portsmouth, after which she was assigned to Force G to give minesweeping support to the Allied landings in Normandy.  Loyalty spent May carrying out exercises and rehearsals, and also escorted sister ship  into Portsmouth after she had been damaged by a mine. Loyalty then took part in the assault operations of 6 June, clearing Channel 6, and then remaining deployed off Gold Beach to cover operations. She remained off Normandy after the landings and throughout July, carrying out sweeps of the anchorages.

Sinking
Loyalty was still off Normandy on 22 August. Loyalty and the minesweeping trawler Doon were dispatched to recover the sweep. As they were doing this Loyalty was attacked and sunk by the German U-boat  at position  in the English Channel. She capsized in less than seven minutes, with the loss of her captain and 18 ratings. There were 30 survivors. Loyalty was replaced in the flotilla by sister ship . The wrecksite is designated as a protected place under the Protection of Military Remains Act 1986.

Notes

References

External links
 HMS Loyalty at naval.history.net
 HMS Loyalty (as Rattler) at uboat.net
 MoD announcement of designation as a war grave
 SI 2008/950 Designation under Protection of Military Remains Act

 

Algerine-class minesweepers of the Royal Navy
Ships built in Belfast
1942 ships
World War II minesweepers of the United Kingdom
Ships sunk by German submarines in World War II
World War II shipwrecks in the English Channel
Protected Wrecks of the United Kingdom
Maritime incidents in August 1944
Ships built by Harland and Wolff